The 2013 Aegon Trophy was a professional tennis tournament played on outdoor grass courts. It was the fifth edition of the tournament which was part of the 2013 ATP Challenger Tour and the 2013 ITF Women's Circuit. It took place in Nottingham, United Kingdom, on 3–9 June 2013.

ATP entrants

Singles

Seeds 

 1 Rankings as of 27 May 2013.

Other entrants 
The following players received wildcards into the singles main draw:
  Alex Bogdanovic
  Edward Corrie
  Dan Evans
  Josh Goodall

The following players received entry from the qualifying draw:
  Prakash Amritraj
  Jamie Baker
  Samuel Groth
  Brydan Klein

Doubles

Seeds 

 1 Rankings are as of May 27, 2013.

Other entrants 
The following pairs received wildcards into the doubles main draw:
  Lewis Burton /  Daniel Evans
  David Rice /  Sean Thornley
  Ken Skupski /  Neal Skupski

The following pair received entry from the qualification into the doubles main draw:
  Benjamin Becker /  Michael Berrer

WTA entrants

Seeds 

 1 Rankings as of 27 May 2013

Other entrants 
The following players received wildcards into the singles main draw:
  Elena Baltacha
  Anne Keothavong
  Johanna Konta
  Tara Moore

The following players received entry from the qualifying draw:
  Madison Brengle
  Gabriela Dabrowski
  An-Sophie Mestach
  Melanie South

Champions

Men's singles 

  Matthew Ebden def.  Benjamin Becker, 7–5, 4–6, 7–5

Women's singles 

  Petra Martić def.  Karolína Plíšková, 6–3, 6–3

Men's doubles 

  Jamie Murray /  John Peers def.  Ken Skupski /  Neal Skupski, 6–2, 6–7(3–7), [10–6]

Women's doubles 

  Maria Sanchez /  Nicola Slater def.  Gabriela Dabrowski /  Sharon Fichman, 4–6, 6–3, [10–8]

External links 
 Official website

2013
2013 ATP Challenger Tour
2013 ITF Women's Circuit
2013 in English tennis
June 2013 sports events in the United Kingdom